

Titles by club

Titles by country

Medals (1997-2022)

See also
IWBF Champions Cup
André Vergauwen Cup
IWBF Challenge Cup
Kitakyushu Champions Cup

References

Wheelchair basketball competitions in Europe
1967 establishments in Europe